MPOWER or MPower or mPower may refer to:

MPOWER tobacco control
BMW M, a subsidiary of BMW AG
B&W mPower, a proposed modular nuclear reactor
M-Power, a software development platform
O3b mPOWER, a medium Earth orbit satellite constellation by SES S.A.
MPower (TV series), a television docuseries from Marvel Studios